Country Financial (capitalized trademark COUNTRY Financial) is a group of US insurance and financial services companies with customers in 19 states.  The group of companies offers a range of insurance and financial products and services, including auto, home, life, farm, commercial insurance, retirement planning, investment management and trust services.  

The Country Financial group is ranked annually in the Fortune 1000 list, which lists American companies by revenue.  

The corporate headquarters are in Bloomington, Illinois.

History
The company was founded in 1925 when a group of Illinois Agricultural Association members developed an organization to provide fire and lightning insurance for farmers.  In the company's first year of operation, more than 385 Illinois farmers worked part-time, offering insurance services to their friends and neighbors.

Crop insurance became available in 1926, auto insurance in 1927, and life insurance in 1929.  Financial services, including retirement planning, estate planning, investment management, and annuities have been available for more than 35 years.

As of 2021, Country Financial and its alliances serve nearly one million households and businesses in 19 states. The company has more than 3,000 employees and 2,000 financial representatives.

A.M. Best rated Country Financial Property Casualty Group as A+ (Superior) in June 2019.  A.M. Best rated Country Financial Life Insurance Company and Country Mutual Insurance Company, as A+ (Superior) in July 2021.

Jim Jacobs is the current CEO, and Miles Kilcoin is the current CFO.

Operating companies 
The Country Financial insurance group consists of multiple operating companies:
 Country Mutual Insurance Company
 Middlesex Mutual Assurance Company
 Holyoke Mutual Insurance Company in Salem
 Country Casualty Insurance Company
 Country Preferred Insurance Company
 Country Life Insurance Company
 Country Investors Life Assurance Company
 Country Trust Bank
 Country Capital Management Company

References

External links

Financial services companies established in 1925
Companies based in Bloomington–Normal
Financial services companies of the United States
Insurance companies based in Illinois
Mutual insurance companies of the United States
1925 establishments in Illinois